Julius von Flotow; full name- Julius Christian Gottlieb Ulrich Gustav Georg Adam Ernst Friedrich von Flotow (9 March 1788 – 15 August 1856) was a German military officer and a botanist specialized in lichenology and bryology.

Von Flotow was born in the village of Pitzerwitz (Pstrowice in Polish) in the region of Neumark. In 1813, he suffered a serious war injury at the Battle of Lützen, from which he never fully recovered and which led to a partial paralysis of his right arm. During a military campaign in France (1819), he took the opportunity to study lichens native to the Ardennes Mountains. In 1850 he wrote of how his acquisition of a high-quality Schiek microscope enhanced his studies. In an 1851 study of the crustose lichen Rimularia gibbosa, he introduced the term . In 1832 he took an early retirement from the military and worked as a private scholar in Hirschberg. Among his written works are the following:

 Reisebericht über eine Excursion nach einem Theile des südöstlichen Riesengebirges (1836)
 Über Haematococcus Pluvialis (1844)
 Lichenes Florae Silesiae (1849–1850)

Von Flotow was a member of several learned societies, notably the Leopoldina and the Senckenberg Nature Research Society. He was a recipient of the Iron Cross and was awarded an honorary degree from the University of Breslau in 1856, a week before his death. The genus Flotovia from the botanical family Asteraceae is named in his honor.

See also
 :Category:Taxa named by Julius von Flotow

References 
 University of Gottingen, Search the Index Collectorum
  translated biography @ Brockhaus Encyclopedic Dictionary

German mycologists
1788 births
1856 deaths
German lichenologists
Recipients of the Iron Cross (1813)